Charles William White (9 September 1838 – 15 October 1890) was an Irish Member of Parliament (MP) in the House of Commons of the United Kingdom of Great Britain and Ireland.

He was elected as one of the two MPs for County Tipperary at a by-election in 1866 following the death of the sitting MP John Blake Dillon, who had been one of the founding members of the Young Ireland movement. He was re-elected at the 1868 and 1874 general elections, but resigned from Parliament on 6 February 1875. He gave no explanation for his resignation, although it was speculated at the time that his support for the Home Rule campaign was 'very reluctant' and his 'heart was not in the cause', and that at the same time he had been advised that his advocacy of Home Rule was inconsistent with his position as an officer in the British Army.

He was appointed Lord Lieutenant of Clare in 1872 and held office until 1879.

References

External links 
 

1838 births
1890 deaths
Lord-Lieutenants of Clare
Members of the Parliament of the United Kingdom for County Tipperary constituencies (1801–1922)
UK MPs 1865–1868
UK MPs 1868–1874
UK MPs 1874–1880
Younger sons of barons
19th-century Irish people